Nepenthes pulchra is a tropical pitcher plant endemic to the Philippine island of Mindanao, where it grows at 1300–1800 m above sea level. Its discovery was announced online in August 2011.

Natural hybrids
 N. alata × N. pulchra
 N. ceciliae × N. pulchra

References

 Gronemeyer, T. 2012. Nepenthes pulchra. In:  Associazione Italiana Piante Carnivore. p. 25.

Carnivorous plants of Asia
pulchra
Plants described in 2011